Mrinalini Sharma (born 27 September) is an Indian model and Bollywood actress.

Early life and education
Sharma hails from New Delhi. Mrinalini did her schooling in Carmel Convent School, Chanakyapuri, New Delhi. Thereafter she did her graduation from Jesus and Mary College, Delhi (University of Delhi).

Career
Sharma started her career as a model in Delhi and soon shifted to Mumbai. She has been cast in many commercial advertisements and began her career in Bollywood with an item number in Prakash Jha’s movie Apaharan.

Her acting career took off with three films with Mahesh Bhatt. The first one was Awarapan in which she got to share the screen space with Emraan Hashmi. The movie also starred  actress Shriya Saran. The other movie was choreographer Raju Khan’s directorial debut Showbiz.

Filmography

References

External links 

 
 
 
 

Indian film actresses
Female models from Mumbai
Living people
Delhi University alumni
Actresses in Hindi cinema
21st-century Indian actresses
1977 births